Professional Air Traffic Controllers Organization (PATCO) is a labor union in the United States, that is affiliated with the Office and Professional Employees International Union (OPEIU, AFL-CIO, CLC). It is certified by the NLRB and currently represents air traffic controllers who work in private sector air traffic control towers, and is actively organizing controllers nationwide. PATCO signed  an Alliance Agreement with the Teamsters Airline Division on October 15, 2008. The union also includes hundreds of former controllers fired during the 1981 strike by the previous union of the same name. PATCO uses the Federally Registered Trade Mark original union's logo to strengthen its claim to the PATCO lineage.

See also

 National Air Traffic Controllers Association
 Professional Air Traffic Controllers Organization (AFSCME)

External links
  website.
 http://www.bulletinboards.com/patco   PATCO Picket Line
 http://www.patcounion.org   PATCO Union Tower site

Trade unions in the United States
Air traffic controllers' trade unions
International Brotherhood of Teamsters
Air traffic control in the United States
Trade unions established in 1996